Munde is a surname. Notable people with the surname include:

Alan Munde (born 1946), American banjo player and bluegrass musician
Dhananjay Munde (born 1975), Indian politician
Gopinath Munde (1949–2014), Indian politician
Pankaja Munde (born 1979), Indian politician
Pritam Munde (born 1983), Indian politician